Jason Ryan Boyarski is an American entertainment attorney specializing in the music industry. He was named one of Billboard's Top Music Lawyers, one of New York Magazine's Leading Lawyers, and a top lawyer by Super Lawyers magazine. He is best known for representing the estate of deceased American recording artist and songwriter Prince for whom he negotiated a deal with Universal Music Publishing Group for the administration of Prince's music publishing catalog and separately with Irving Azoff's Global Music Rights for a performance-rights deal.  Boyarski also brokered a distribution agreement with Sony Music for Prince's catalog and negotiated several deals that opened Prince's music vault for the first time.  A former music publishing executive, Boyarski also represents songwriters Bruno Mars' "24K Magic", Camila Cabello's "Havana", Post Malone's "rockstar" and Luis Fonsi's "Despacito". His client, songwriter Louis Bell, has been awarded the honor of ASCAP Songwriter of the Year for two years in a row from 2019 to 2020. Boyarski is currently a partner in the New York-based law firm Boyarski Fritz LLP, which he co-founded with entertainment attorney David Fritz.

Education and early career 
Jason Ryan Boyarski was born in 1974 to New York city natives, Ellie and Joel Boyarski. He began attending Emory University in Atlanta in 1992. While attending Emory University, Boyarski was a student representative and worked as an intern at Sony Music Entertainment's Atlanta office. Boyarski graduated from Emory University in 1996 with a Bachelor of Business Administration. Following his graduation, Boyarski began employment at NBC where he worked as a production assistant for NBC's Today Show. Shortly thereafter, Boyarski joined Sony Music's 550 Music label where he served in the Promotions Department and worked on projects including artists Celine Dion, Ben Folds Five, and Ginuwine.

Boyarski began attending Benjamin N. Cardozo School of Law in New York in 1997, graduating cum laude in 2000 with a focus on intellectual property law. Boyarski was also honored as a member of the Order of the Coif for finishing in the top 10% of his law school graduating class. Additionally, Boyarski was the Administrative Editor of the Cardozo Law Review where he published a law review note "The Heist of Feist: Protection for Collections of Information and the Possible Federalization of 'Hot News'". During law school, Boyarski worked as a law clerk at Epstein, Levinsohn, Bodine, Hurwitz & Weinstein, LLP and also served as a Summer Associate for the law firm Weil, Gotshal & Manges LLP.

Career 
Boyarski was employed at Weil, Gotshal & Manges LLP as an Associate in the Trade Practices & Regulatory Law Department. Boyarski left in 2002 and began working at BMG Music Publishing in New York as an associate director for legal and business affairs. Between 2002 and 2006, Boyarski was promoted to senior director for legal and business affairs by BMG Music Publishing before being promoted to vice president for legal and business affairs in 2006.

Following UMG's acquisition of BMG in late 2006, Boyarski remained as the vice president for legal and business affairs for Universal Music Publishing Group until 2008 where Boyarski was hired by Warner/Chappell Music as Senior Vice President and GM. In 2008, Boyarski also separately co-founded the marketing agency HeadOverHeels Collective. Boyarski left Warner/Chappell in 2011, soon co-founding the New York-based law firm Boyarski Fritz LLP with entertainment attorney David Fritz in November 2011. The firm specializes in deal-making and transactions.

Representation of Prince's estate 
After musician Prince died, Boyarski was hired by the bank and Special Administrator of Prince's estate, Bemer Trust, to help negotiate a deal with Universal Music Publishing Group for the rights to Prince's music publishing catalog. Boyarski finalized a deal with Universal Music Publishing Group in October 2016 which was valued at thirty million dollars. Prince had withdrawn from the American Society of Composers, Authors and Publishers in 2014 which left his catalog without any performance rights society. In January 2017, Boyarski reached an agreement with Irving Azoff's Global Music Rights for performance-rights. In the same month, a Minnesotan judge ruled that Comerica Bank would begin overseeing Prince's estate and under Comerica, Boyarski began to focus on Prince's other intellectual property rights and became the overall entertainment attorney for the estate. As the lead entertainment attorney for Prince's Estate, Boyarski put together the deals in 2018 that opened the late icon's music vault for the first time, including the previously unreleased Piano & a Microphone album from 1983 on Warner Bros. Records and an album of material that Jay-Z and the Prince Estate agreed to release together on Tidal. He also brokered a 35-album deal in June 2018 with Sony Music that made 23 catalog albums available on streaming services. In 2020, Boyarski negotiated a deal with SiriusXM to create a limited-time channel devoted exclusively to Prince's music.

Personal life 
Shortly after he began employment at BMG Music Publishing, Boyarski married fiancée, Robin Alissa Katz at the Essex House in New York City. He lives in Brookville, New York and has two children.

References 

Living people
1974 births
Emory University alumni
Benjamin N. Cardozo School of Law alumni
American entertainment lawyers
20th-century American lawyers
21st-century American lawyers